Belle Plaine is a city in Sumner County, Kansas, United States.  As of the 2020 census, the population of the city was 1,467.

History
Belle Plaine was founded in 1871. Belle Plaine is a French name meaning "beautiful plain".  In 1883, Belle Plaine was a station and shipping point for the Southern Central & Fort Scott Railway. By 1910, it was at the junction of two railroads, the Missouri Pacific and the Atchison, Topeka & Santa Fe.  The first post office in Belle Plaine was established in April 1871. In the fall of 1871 and spring of 1872, Miss Olive North taught a subscription school; and, in 1873, school district (No. 2) was established.

Geography
Belle Plaine is located at  (37.394214, -97.279076).

Climate
The climate in this area is characterized by hot, humid summers and generally mild to cool winters.  According to the Köppen Climate Classification system, Belle Plaine has a humid subtropical climate, abbreviated "Cfa" on climate maps.

Area events
 Belle Plaine’s Downtown Festival

Area attractions
 Bartlett Arboretum, a nature preserve which incorporates a small concert venue.

Demographics

2010 census
As of the census of 2010, there were 1,681 people, 630 households, and 466 families residing in the city. The racial makeup of the city was 96.1% White, 0.4% African American, 1.1% Native American, 0.1% Asian, 0.1% Pacific Islander, 0.5% from other races, and 1.7% from two or more races. Hispanic or Latino of any race were 3.1% of the population.

There were 630 households, of which 40.8% had children under the age of 18 living with them, 55.2% were married couples living together, 12.2% had a female householder with no husband present, 6.5% had a male householder with no wife present, and 26.0% were non-families. 23.5% of all households were made up of individuals, and 9.7% had someone living alone who was 65 years of age or older. The average household size was 2.67 and the average family size was 3.14.

The median age in the city was 35.5 years. 30.2% of residents were under the age of 18; 7.7% were between the ages of 18 and 24; 24.1% were from 25 to 44; 26% were from 45 to 64; and 12% were 65 years of age or older. The gender makeup of the city was 51.5% male and 48.5% female.

2000 census
As of the census of 2000, there were 1,708 people, 662 households, and 475 families residing in the city. The racial makeup of the city was 93.21% White, 0.06% African American, 0.82% Native American, 0.29% Asian, 1.17% from other races, and 4.45% from two or more races. Hispanic or Latino of any race were 2.22% of the population.

There were 662 households, out of which 38.4% had children under the age of 18 living with them, 56.5% were married couples living together, 11.0% had a female householder with no husband present, and 28.1% were non-families. 26.0% of all households were made up of individuals, and 13.9% had someone living alone who was 65 years of age or older. The average household size was 2.58 and the average family size was 3.12.

In the city, the population was spread out, with 30.7% under the age of 18, 7.4% from 18 to 24, 28.6% from 25 to 44, 19.6% from 45 to 64, and 13.7% who were 65 years of age or older. The median age was 36 years. For every 100 females, there were 98.1 males. For every 100 females age 18 and over, there were 90.5 males.

The median income for a household in the city was $38,125, and the median income for a family was $47,422. Males had a median income of $34,821 versus $22,778 for females. The per capita income for the city was $16,414. About 7.9% of families and 9.2% of the population were below the poverty line, including 11.4% of those under age 18 and 9.0% of those age 65 or over.

Education
The community is served by Belle Plaine USD 357 public school district.

Notable people 
 Jesse Beams (1898–1977) - physicist at University of Virginia, was born in Belle Plaine
 Robin Lynn Macy (1958) - math teacher, community organizer, guitarist, co-founder of the Dixie Chicks, director of Bartlett Aboretum

References

Further reading

 Tinius, G. R. (1956). An Early History of the Church in Paradise Valley (Belle Plaine, Kansas).

External links

 City of Belle Plaine
 Belle Plaine - Directory of Public Officials
 Belle Plaine Chamber of Commerce
 Belle Plaine city map, KDOT

Cities in Kansas
Cities in Sumner County, Kansas
Wichita, KS Metropolitan Statistical Area
1871 establishments in Kansas
Populated places established in 1871